The 1896–97 season was the fifth in the history of the Western Football League, which had been known as the Bristol & District league until 1895.

Warmley were the Division One champions for the fourth time in five years, and also began competing in the Southern League during this season. Eastville Wanderers won Division Two in only their second season in the league.

At the end of this season the league was restructured, with a new Professional Section being formed, taking five clubs from Division One and three new clubs joining. Division One and Division Two remained as the Amateur Section, with four clubs being promoted from Division Two to Division One, and several new clubs joining both divisions.

Division One
One new club joined Division One for this season, though the number of clubs was reduced from 12 to nine after Gloucester and Swindon Wanderers left, Cardiff were expelled and Mangotsfield were relegated to Division Two.
Bristol South End

Division Two
One new team joined Division Two this season, though the number of clubs was reduced from 11 to seven after Cumberland, Clifton Reserves, St George Reserves and Warmley Reserves left the league and Frenchay resigned.
Mangotsfield, relegated from Division One

References

1896-97
1896–97 in English association football leagues